Oak Grove is an unincorporated community in Murray County, Oklahoma, United States, located on U.S. Highway 177. It is 6.5 miles north of Sulphur, 11.5 miles south of Stratford and six miles west of Roff.

References 

DeLorme (2003). Oklahoma Atlas & Gazetteer. Yarmouth, Maine: DeLorme. 

Unincorporated communities in Murray County, Oklahoma
Unincorporated communities in Oklahoma